Al-Qurayya (also spelled al-Qrayya or Kureiyeh) is a town in southern Syria, administratively part of the al-Suwayda Governorate, located south of al-Suwayda. Nearby localities include Bosra to the southwest, Hout to the south, Salkhad to the southeast, al-Kafr, Hibran and Sahwat al-Khudr to the northeast, Sahwat Bilata and Rasas to the north and 'Ara and al-Mujaymer to the northwest. According to the Syria Central Bureau of Statistics (CBS), al-Qurayya had a population of 6,789 in the 2004 census. The town is also the administrative center of the al-Qurayya nahiyah which consists of four towns with a combined population of 9,892.

History
Western scholar Josias Leslie Porter identified al-Qurayya with biblical "Kerioth" mentioned by Jeremiah as one of the cities in the plain of Moab. The prophet Amos wrote that he would "devour the palaces of Kerioth." The city is later mentioned in the 4th-century CE as "Koreath," a village belonging to Bosra in the Roman province Arabia Petraea. However, this "Koreath" has also been identified with the nearby palace of Ein Qarata to the south of the Lejat plain. On streets and alleyways throughout the village were the remains of several columns. A Greek inscription was found on one of the stones and dated back to 296 CE.

Ottoman period
In 1596 al-Qurayya appeared in the Ottoman tax registers being part of the nahiya of Bani Nasiyya in the Qada of Hauran. It had an entirely Muslim population consisting of 65 households and 36 bachelors. Taxes were paid on wheat, barley, summer crops, fruit- or other trees.

In 1810 al-Qurayya contained a few Druze families and was the chief village in the areas south and southwest of 'Ara in Jabal al-Arab. Between the 1830s and 1840s, the prominent al-Atrash clan chose the village as their principal residence. It was granted to them by the initial Druze rulers of the village, the al-Hamdan clan. It was still subject to raids by Bedouin nomads at that time. In April 1838, while young Druze fighters from al-Qurayya were confronting the Egyptian army of Ibrahim Pasha, the village was looted and several of its inhabitants were killed in a raid by Sheikh Ibn Sumayr and his 'Anza Bedouin tribe. Further major raids against al-Qurayya occurred in 1842 and 1846.

Only in the 1850s did relative stability take root. In 1852 al-Qurayya, then seat of Ismail al-Atrash, became the headquarters of Druze resistance against an Ottoman conscription decree. According to Porter, who visited al-Qurayya in 1853, the village had shrunk from one of the major towns of the Hauran plain to a small village. Many of its houses were built from ancient materials. Its chief in the 1850s was Sami Faruq Pasha al-Atrash, the most powerful Druze sheikh in the Hauran. In 1856-57 al-Qurayya served as the base for the Druze in their offensive against the Muslim villages of the Hauran.

French Mandate period
The French Mandate authorities bombed al-Qurayya and destroyed the home of its sheikh Sultan Pasha al-Atrash in a clash in 1921. During the Great Syrian Revolt of 1925-27, which was spearheaded by Sultan Pasha, al-Qurayya served as the chief meeting place for the sheikhs of local rebel clans.

Notable people
Sultan al-Atrash
Mansur al-Atrash

References

Bibliography

External links
Map of the town, Google Maps

Populated places in Salkhad District
Towns in Syria
Druze communities in Syria